Statistics of Empress's Cup in the 2013 season.

Overview
It was contested by 36 teams, and INAC Kobe Leonessa won the championship.

Results

1st round
Osaka University of Health and Sport Sciences 2-2 (pen 4-5) Nippon Sport Science University
Fukuoka J. Anclas 1-4 Ehime FC
Kanto Gakuen University 3-1 Fujieda Junshin High School
Nojima Stella Kanagawa 1-2 Hinomoto Gakuen High School
Naruto Uzushio High School 0-3 Fukui University of Technology Fukui High School
Hoo High School 2-0 Cerezo Osaka Sakai
AC Nagano Parceiro 0-5 AS Elfen Sayama FC
Angeviolet Hiroshima 2-3 Shizuoka Sangyo University
Kamimura Gakuen High School 3-0 Hokkaido Bunkyo University Meisei High School
Mashiki Renaissance Kumamoto FC 0-6 JFA Academy Fukushima
Waseda University 3-0 Sendai University
Shimizudaihachi Pleiades 1-2 Japan Soccer College

2nd round
Nippon Sport Science University 1-4 Ehime FC
Kanto Gakuen University 2-8 Kibi International University
Tokiwagi Gakuken High School 0-6 Hinomoto Gakuen High School
Fukui University of Technology Fukui High School 1-2 Hoo High School
AS Elfen Sayama FC 2-0 Shizuoka Sangyo University
Kamimura Gakuen High School 1-6 Sfida Setagaya FC
Speranza FC Osaka-Takatsuki 4-1 JFA Academy Fukushima
Waseda University 4-0 Japan Soccer College

3rd round
INAC Kobe Leonessa 10-0 Ehime FC
Kibi International University 2-1 Urawa Reds
Iga FC Kunoichi 3-1 Hinomoto Gakuen High School
Hoo High School 0-10 Vegalta Sendai
Okayama Yunogo Belle 4-3 AS Elfen Sayama FC
Sfida Setagaya FC 2-5 JEF United Chiba
Albirex Niigata 3-0 Speranza FC Osaka-Takatsuki
Waseda University 0-4 Nippon TV Beleza

Quarterfinals
INAC Kobe Leonessa 7-0 Kibi International University
Iga FC Kunoichi 2-1 Vegalta Sendai
Okayama Yunogo Belle 2-0 JEF United Chiba
Albirex Niigata 1-0 Nippon TV Beleza

Semifinals
Albirex Niigata 1-0 Okayama Yunogo Belle
INAC Kobe Leonessa 3-2 Iga FC Kunoichi

Final
INAC Kobe Leonessa 2-2 (pen 4-3) Albirex Niigata
INAC Kobe Leonessa won the championship.

References

Empress's Cup
2013 in Japanese women's football